Land og Folk (Land and People) was a Danish communist newspaper published from 1919 to 1990. It became the main organ of the Communist Party of Denmark (DKP) from 1920 and boomed in circulation during World War II, growing from 12,000 copies in 1940 to 120,000 copies in 1945. The paper was printed in Copenhagen, but distributed countrywide.

History and profile
The newspaper was established as a weekly in 1919 under the name of Arbejdet (Danish: The Labour). In 1920, it became the central organ of the DKP. The following year it was renamed as Arbejderbladet (Danish: The Worker's Paper) after the formation of the Communist Federation. From 1934, the paper was published on a daily basis.

Its title was Arbejderbladet until June 1941 which was changed to Land og Folk on 1 March 1942, after a brief existence with the title Politiske Maanedsbreve (Danish: Political Monthly Letters). During the German occupation of Denmark in World War II, on 22 June 1941, and a few months before Denmark joined a revised anti-comintern pact in November that same year, Danish police arrested and detained hundreds of communists. On 22 August 1941 the paper was banned. However, it continued to be published illegally by the Danish resistance movement until 1945.

In 1950, an automatic Mercedes printing machine and in 1969 a printing press were given to Land og Folk by the East German ruling communist party, SED.

Frede Jakobsen served as the editor-in-chief of Land og Folk which was based in Copenhagen.

In the 1960s the subscribers of Land og Folk included large number of Russians, and the paper was sent to Moscow each day.

Land og Folk ceased publication in 1982. It was later restarted, but permanently folded in 1990.

The photo archive of Land og Folk is kept in Arbejdermuseet in Copenhagen.

Circulation
In the 1920s its circulation ranged between 4,000 and 6,000 copies. During the next decade its circulation was significantly increased and became nearly 12,000 copies in 1940. By the end of the Nazi occupation in 1945 the paper had a daily circulation of 120,000 copies. During the last six months of 1957 the paper sold 10,833 copies on weekdays. Land og Folk had a circulation of 7,100 copies in 1975.

See also
List of Danish newspapers

References

External links

1919 establishments in Denmark
1990 disestablishments in Denmark
Banned newspapers
Communism in Denmark
Communist newspapers
Daily newspapers published in Denmark
Danish-language newspapers
Defunct newspapers published in Denmark
Defunct weekly newspapers
Newspapers established in 1919
Newspapers published in Copenhagen
Publications disestablished in 1990
Underground press in World War II
Weekly newspapers published in Denmark